Ajisukitakahikone (also Ajishikitakahikone or Ajisukitakahiko) is a kami in Japanese mythology.

Name
The god is referred to both as 'Ajisukitakahikone-no-Kami' (阿遅鉏高日子根神; Old Japanese: Adisuki1takapi1ko1ne-no2-Kami2) and 'Ajishikitakahikone-no-Kami' (阿遅志貴高日子根神; Man'yōgana: 阿治志貴多迦比古泥能迦微; O.J.: Adisiki2takapi1ko1ne) in the Kojiki, while the Nihon Shoki consistently calls him 'Ajisukitakahikone-no-Kami' (味耜高彥根神). Renditions of the name found in other texts include 'Ajisukitakahiko-no-Mikoto' (阿遅須枳高日子命; Izumo Fudoki), 'Ajisukitakahikone-no-Mikoto-no-Kami' (阿遅須伎高日古尼命神; Harima Fudoki) and 'Ajisukitakahikone-no-Mikoto' (阿遅須伎高孫根乃命; Izumo-no-Kuni-no-Miyatsuko no Kan'yogoto).

Aji (O.J. adi) may mean either "excellent" (cf. aji "taste, flavor") or "flock, mass, many", while shiki (O.J. siki2) is variously interpreted either as a corruption of suki (O.J. suki1, "spade" or "plough"), a derivation from the Baekje word suki "village", a word meaning "blade", or a place name in Yamato Province. (One factor that complicates a proper interpretation of the name is that ki1 and ki2 are thought to be different syllables in Old Japanese.)

Basil Hall Chamberlain, in his 1882 translation of the Kojiki, left the name untranslated (noting that "[t]he meaning of the first two members of this compound name is altogether obscure"); likewise, William George Aston (1896) merely commented that there is "no satisfactory explanation of this name." Donald Philippi (1968) proposed two possible interpretations of the name: "Massed-Ploughs High-Princeling Deity" or "Excellent Shiki High-Princeling Deity" (with 'Shiki' being understood here to be a toponym). Gustav Heldt's translation of the Kojiki (2014) meanwhile renders the name as "Lofty Little Lad of Fine Plows".

Mythology

Parentage
The Kojiki describes Ajisukitakahikone as one of the two children of the god Ōkuninushi by Takiribime, one of the three Munakata goddesses, the other being Shitateruhime (also known as Takahime).

In infancy, his crying and screaming were so loud that he had to be placed in a boat and sailed around the islands of Japan until he was calm. In adulthood, he was the father of Takitsuhiko, a rain god.

Ajisukitakahikone and Ame-no-Wakahiko

When the sun goddess Amaterasu and the primordial god Takamimusubi, the rulers of the heavenly realm of Takamagahara, decreed that the earth below (Ashihara-no-Nakatsukuni) should be ruled over by Amaterasu's progeny, they dispatched a series of messengers to its ruler, Ōkuninushi, to command him to cede supremacy over the land. One of these, Ame-no-Wakahiko, ended up marrying Shitateruhime, one of Ōkuninushi's daughters, and even plotted to gain the land for himself. After eight years had passed, a pheasant sent by the heavenly gods arrived and remonstrated with Ame-no-Wakahiko, who killed it with his bow and arrow. The arrow flew up to Takamagahara, but was then promptly thrown back to earth; it struck Ame-no-Wakahiko in the chest while he was asleep, killing him instantly.

During Ame-no-Wakahiko's funeral, Shitateruhime's brother Ajisukitakahikone, a close friend of Ame-no-Wakahiko, arrived to pay his condolences. As he closely resembled Ame-no-Wakahiko in appearance, the family of the deceased mistook him for Ame-no-Wakahiko come back to life. Offended at being mistaken for his friend (as corpses were regarded as unclean, to be compared with or mistaken for a dead person was seen as an insult), Ajisukitakahikone in anger drew his ten-span sword, hacked to pieces the funeral hut (喪屋 moya) where Ame-no-Wakahiko's corpse was laid and the funeral held, and then kicked it away. The ruined hut landed in the land of Mino and became a mountain called Moyama (喪山, lit. 'mourning mountain').

Ajishikitakahikone, still fuming, then flew off, the radiance that exuded from him being such that it illuminated the space of two hills and two valleys. Shitateruhime, wishing to reveal to the mourners her brother's identity, then composed the following song in his honor:

{|
! Man'yōgana (Kojiki)|| || Japanese|| || Old Japanese || || Modern Japanese (Rōmaji) || || Translated by Donald Philippi
|-
| 阿米那流夜淤登多那婆多能宇那賀世流多麻能美須麻流美須麻流能阿那陀麻波夜美多邇布多和多良須阿治志貴多迦比古泥能迦微曾
|  
| 
|  
| Ame2 naru yaOto2-tanabata no2unagaserutama no2 misumarumisumaru nianadama pa yami1taniputa watarasuAdisiki2Takapi1ko1ne no2 Kami2 so2
|  
| Ame naru yaOto-tanabata nounagaserutama no misumarumisumaru nianadama ha yamitanifuta watarasuAjishikiTakahikone noKami zo 
|  
| Ah, the large jewel
Strung on the cord of beads
Worn around the neck
Of the heavenly
Young weaving maiden!
Like this is he
Who crosses
Two valleys at once,
The god Ajishiki-
Takahikone!
|}

Notes

References

See also
Ōkuninushi
Takemikazuchi
Ame-no-wakahiko

Japanese gods
Thunder gods
Shinto kami
Kunitsukami